Holtland is a municipality in the district of Leer, in Lower Saxony, Germany.

References

Towns and villages in East Frisia
Leer (district)